The Poker Tour Finnkampen or Pokerfinnkampen is an annual poker tournament established in 2006. Pokerfinnkampen is the official poker national competition between Sweden and Finland.

Sweden and Finland have a long tradition of good competitions regardless if it is athletics, ice hockey or motor sports. Now with the addition of Poker the excitement is completed. The first pilot tournament of Pokerfinnkampen, held in Stockholm, finished with Finland ending up as the clear winner by achieving a victory in all three competition categories; individual ranking, terminator achievement and country total player points.

The competition is played as No Limit Texas Hold’em tournaments with up to 100 players representing each country. From 2007 to 2011 all tournaments have been held at the largest casino in Tallinn – Estonia, Reval Park Hotel & Casino.

The Tournament is conducted in English. The websites for Pokerfinnkampen are:
 www.pokerfinnkampen.com
 www.suomiruotsi.com

Pokerfinnkampen was founded by the company Poker Icons AB. Poker Icons is still the owner of the brand and the organizer of all the tournaments.

One of the most prominent players that has played Pokerfinnkampen is the Finnish poker star Ilari Sahamies (aka Ziigmund).

Poker Tour Finnkampen Champions
2011: Team Finland
2011: Individual  Stefan Ericsson, representing Sweden
2011: Terminator Stefan Ericsson, representing Sweden
2010: Team Finland
2010: Individual  Dino Dinler, representing Finland
2010: Terminator Peter Pihlström, representing Sweden
2009: Team Finland
2009: Individual Jari Mähönen, representing Finland
2009: Terminator Samir Shakhtoor, representing Sweden
2008: Team Finland
2008: Individual Antti Lehtinen, representing Finland
2008: Terminator tied between Janne Pitko, representing Finland and Gusten Sjöberg, representing Sweden
2007: Team Finland
2007: Individual Dino Dinler, representing Finland
2007: Terminator Dino Dinler, representing Finland
2006: Team Finland
2006: Individual Ilari Salasalmi, representing Finland
2006: Terminator Martin von Zweigbergk, representing Finland

Poker Tour Finnkampen Event Winners
2009
Event I  25–26 April 2009
2009-I: Team Finland
2009-I: Individual Jari Mähönen, representing Finland
2009-I: Terminator Samir Shakhtoor, representing Sweden

Event II  5–6 September 2009
2009-II: Team Finland
2009-II: Individual Kristiina Myllyoja, representing Finland
2009-II: Terminator Jonas Frisk, representing Sweden

Event III  14–15 November 2009
2009-III: Team Finland
2009-III: Individual Minna Ritakorpi, representing Finland
2009-III: Terminator Matti Tiainen, representing Finland

2008
Event I  24–25 May 2008
2008-I: Team Finland
2008-I: Individual Erik Eklund, representing Finland
2008-I: Terminator Janne Pitko, representing Finland

Event II  13–14 September 2008
2008-II: Team Sweden
2008-II: Individual Magdalena In de Betou, representing Sweden
2008-II: Terminator Gusten Sjöberg, representing Sweden

Event III  6–7 December 2008
2008-III: Team Finland
2008-III: Individual Antti Lehtinen, representing Finland
2008-III: Terminator Teemu Tuomala, representing Finland

2007
Event I  2–3 March 2007
2007-I: Team Finland
2007-I: Individual Panu Palomäki, representing Finland
2007-I: Terminator Niko Lehmonen, representing Finland

Event II  12–13 May 2007
2007-II: Team Finland
2007-II: Individual Christer Hemphälä, representing Sweden
2007-II: Terminator Christer Hemphälä, representing Sweden

Event III  1–2 September 2007
2007-III: Team Sweden
2007-III: Individual Mikael Bredenberg, representing Sweden
2007-III: Terminator Dino Dinler, representing Finland

Event IV  1–2 December 2007
2007-IV: Team Finland
2007-IV: Individual Dino Dinler, representing Finland
2007-IV: Terminator Dino Dinler, representing Finland

See also
World Series of Poker
Finnkampen

References

External links
Official site

Poker tournaments in Europe